The Big Little Books, first published during 1932 by the Whitman Publishing Company of Racine, Wisconsin, were small, compact books designed with a captioned illustration opposite each page of text. Other publishers, notably Saalfield, adopted this format after Whitman achieved success with its early titles, priced initially at 10¢ each, later rising to 15¢.

Format
The interior book design usually displayed full-page black-and-white illustrations on the right side, facing the pages of text on the left. Stories were often related to radio programs (The Shadow), comic strips (The Gumps), children's books (Uncle Wiggily), novels (John Carter of Mars) and movies (Bambi). Later books of the series had interior color illustrations.

History
After the first Big Little Book, The Adventures of Dick Tracy, was published (December 1932), numerous titles were sold through Woolworth's and other retail store systems during the 1930s. With a name change to Better Little Books during 1938, the series continued into the 1960s. Variations such as Dime Action Books were produced by other publishers, as noted by the Collecting Channel's Andy Hooper:

Recently, Robert Thibadeau's  project at Carnegie Mellon University has made at least two Big Little Books available online. Thibadeau attempts to "capture the entire production" of an old book with facsimile images showing pages with wear and tear. "We're basically trying to eternalize that book as it is," says Thibadeau. The Antique Books Digital Library offers two free Big Little Book titles, Tim McCoy on the Tomahawk Trail and Bronc Peeler The Lone Cowboy. Fred Harman's Bronc Peeler was a Western comic strip character who was a precursor to another comic strip drawn by Harman, the more successful Red Ryder.

Mighty Midgets
From 1939 the British Woolworths Group sold "Mighty Midgets", 32-page books that measured  and were sold at the artificially low price of threepence; the price subsidised by a full page advertisement on the back.

In popular culture 
Sam Mendes' film Road to Perdition (2002) showed a boy reading The Lone Ranger Big Little Book, but this was an anachronism since the movie is set during 1931, a year prior to the first Big Little Books and two years before The Lone Ranger premiered January 31, 1933 on radio.

References

Further reading
Tom McCoy on the Tomahawk Trail
The Big Little Book Price Guide (1983) – James Stuart Thomas
Big Big Little Book Book (2004) – Arnold T. Blumberg

External links
 Biglittlebooks.com
 Big Little Books at Lileks
 Title index at Broward.org
 Big Little Book Collection at Library of Congress
 Charles G. Wright Collection of Big Little Books 1933–1943 at NCSU Library

American adventure novels
Novel series
Western (genre) novels
Works based on comics
Spin-offs
Books by type